Ochsenheimeria hugginsi is a moth of the family Ypsolophidae. It is found in the central Himalayas in India.

References

Moths described in 1953
Ypsolophidae
Moths of Asia